Ystradowen railway station served the village of Ystradowen in the Vale of Glamorgan in South Wales. It was on the Cowbridge and Aberthaw line.

History and Description

Ystradowen was initially the only intermediate station between Llantrisant and Cowbridge. The cutting immediately before the station was the heaviest earthwork on the line, at fifteen feet deep, and itself preceded a stiff gradient of 1 in 45. The station as completed consisted of a passing loop, with the single platform on the 'up' line with one small siding which served a stone goods shed to the rear of the platform. The goods shed was a 'dead end' type, with the roadway diagonally opposite the rail approach. This involved the somewhat awkward process of reversing carts up to the loading platform. When the line was inspected in 1864, the inspector disapproved of the location of Ystradowen station, due to the steep gradients, and the fact that a number of slips had been made in the cuttings. The station was subsequently dismantled and re-located to satisfy the Board of Trade, meaning that it was a considerable distance from the village. It was finally opened when passenger services began on 18 September 1865. The station was much-used on market days in Pontypridd.

Ystradowen station closed in 1951 when passenger services on the branch were withdrawn. The goods facilities lasted until 1960, but the sidings remained for a number of years.

References

Disused railway stations in the Vale of Glamorgan
Former Taff Vale Railway stations
Railway stations in Great Britain opened in 1865
Railway stations in Great Britain closed in 1951